Peter Flynn may refer to:

Peter Flynn (footballer) (born 1936), Scottish footballer
Peter Flynn (sheriff), see Peter Forman
C. Peter Flynn
Pete Flynn, see Purple Radio (London)